The Dewar Cup Billingham  was an indoor tennis event held from 1971 through 1973 and played in Billingham, Teesside, England as part of the Dewar Cup circuit  of indoor tournaments held throughout the United Kingdom.

Finals

Men's singles

Men's doubles

Women's singles

Women's doubles

References

External links
Billingham Results

Defunct tennis tournaments in the United Kingdom
Tennis tournaments in England
Indoor tennis tournaments
Billingham